Ledo Pizza is a pizzeria restaurant chain in the Mid-Atlantic and  Southeastern United States headquartered in Annapolis, Maryland. Their first pizzeria was opened in Adelphi, Maryland, in 1955 on University Boulevard (Maryland Route 193) in Adelphi Shopping Center near the University of Maryland, College Park. The first franchise was granted to the Fireside Restaurant in Berwyn Heights, Maryland, in 1979. Fireside Restaurant no longer exists. There are now over 100 restaurants in Maryland, Virginia, West Virginia, North Carolina, South Carolina,
Florida, New York City and Washington, D.C.

Overview
Ledo Pizza is rectangular in shape and is known for its very thin crust, sweet sauce, thick pepperoni (one per slice; optional), and smoked provolone cheese, often using the tagline "Ledo Pizza is square, because we don't cut corners."

The restaurant chain has been called by several names, including Ledo Pizza and Ledo Pizza and Pasta.

The original location in Adelphi, Maryland, at the Adelphi Shopping Center was established in 1955. The name on its website is "Tommy Marcos' Ledo Restaurant". The original location is not listed in the restaurant finder maintained by  website. The omission from the chain's website may be related to a legal dispute between the Ledo chain and the Marcos family. The same pizza based on the same family recipe is served at TJ Elliots in Bowie, Maryland, along with many of the other signature Italian-American and family dishes. TJ Elliots is owned and operated by Tommy and Jimmy Marcos.

In September 2009, the Marcos family announced that the original Ledo's restaurant would be moving a few miles from its original location to downtown College Park. The original location closed in July 2010, and the new location opened for business on August 27, 2010.  The College Park restaurant closed in November 2020 and reopened a year later as a Ledo franchise location.

Recognition
In 2019, Ledo Pizza was rated #31 on the Pizza Today Top 100 Companies list with 2018 gross sales of $120,000,000 from its 106 restaurants. Ledo Pizza was named among the best pizzas in America on The Oprah Winfrey Show.

References

External links
 Chain of Ledo Pizza restaurants
 Skateboard Series sponsored by Ledo's

Restaurants in Washington, D.C.
Restaurants in Maryland
Companies based in Anne Arundel County, Maryland
Economy of the Southeastern United States
Regional restaurant chains in the United States
Pizza chains of the United States
1955 establishments in Maryland
Restaurants established in 1955
American companies established in 1955